The Ayaş Tunnel is a railway tunnel under construction near Ayaş town of Ankara Province in Central Anatolia, Turkey. It was initially projected to shorten the railway line connecting Ankara with Istanbul.

Background
The construction of Ayaş Tunnel was planned in 1943 as part of a higher-speed rail service project. The travel time would reduce from seven-and-half hours to two-and-half hours.

After 33-years of suspension, the project came into force in 1976 when groundbreaking took place in presence of Prime Minister Süleyman Demirel on the western entrance at Ayaş side of the mountain. The next year in 1977, Deputy Prime Minister Necmettin Erbakan initiated the digging work at the tunnel's opposite entrance in the east near Erkeksu village. At that time, it was announced that the construction of the -long tunnel would be completed in seven years.

During the time after the 1980 military coup, the construction works at the tunnel did not progress as expected although it was taken several times in consideration by the government. Prime Minister Turgut Özal, who came into power following the 1983 general election, was a pro-highway and an anti-railway politician. So, he stopped the building of the railway tunnel for a long time. In the meantime, the construction of the Istanbul–Ankara motorway  began. After completion of the motorway, discussions flamed about the railway systems that led to the remembrance of the Ayaş Tunnel. In 1987, it was decided to update the studies of the Ayaş Tunnel Project.

Bidding consortiums from France, Germany, Italy, United Kingdom and Belgium submitted tenders proposing project's realization by financing through foreign loan instead of unattractive build-operate-transfer method. The tunnel project resumed when Süleyman Demirel became prime minister again in 1991. The construction works accelerated with government's funding, however these efforts did not suffice to complete the -long tunnel. The tunnel could be bored in a length of  until the Justice and Development Party (AKP) took over the government following the 2002 general election. At that time, the total expenditures amounted to 701 million.

The Minister of Transport, Maritime and Communication Binali Yıldırım stopped the high-speed rail project of Istanbul-Ankara and hence the Ayaş Tunnel construction. The entrance to the tunnel was closed, and ashes were dumped in pile in front of the tunnel's both entrances. For the water management of the groundwater that seeped into the tunnel, 200–300 thousand had to be spent annually. The total cost for the tunnel's maintenance amounted to 2.9 million between 2001 and 2012.

Current state
In 2010, the Department of Railways, Harbors and Airports (DLH) of the ministry undertook studies on the high-speed rail project between Ankara and Ayaş, the -long section of the initial Ankara–Istanbul railway line project, which had come to standstill. That project had already undergone a revision to a line between Ankara and Arifiye only. The budget for the extra works was given with around 150 million. The opening of the line was seen as important for the development of tourism in the region, and for an economic transportation of one-million tons of trona mineral annually from Çayırhan mine.

The study found out that the railway infrastructure between Çayırhan and Sincan did not meet the standard requirements of high-speed rail. It appeared that the cross section of the tunnel was insufficient to withstand the aerodynamic pressure of the high-speed rail even though the other railway infrastructure would have been improved.

The ministry announced in February 2013 that studies are being conducted for the resume of boring work for the remaining  section of the tunnel. With the realization of the tunnel project and opening of the railway line, a railway station will be built in Beypazarı town.

Technical details
Nurol Construction began the construction of the tunnel in 1976. In 2012, the same company took over the project's realization.

Its cross section is horseshoe shaped. The tunnel's -long section is constructed by cut-and-cover method while for the main part of  the New Austrian Tunnelling method was applied.

References

Railway tunnels in Turkey
Transport in Ankara Province
Buildings and structures under construction in Turkey
Turkish State Railways